is a district in the Shinagawa ward of Tokyo, Japan. The district straddles the Meguro River, and is located between the Meguro and Ōsaki stations on the JR Yamanote Line.

The district is centered on Gotanda Station, which is served by the Toei Asakusa Line and the elevated Tōkyū Ikegami Line as well as the Yamanote line.

District profile
The JR loop divides the district in half, with Higashi (East) Gotanda lying inside the Yamanote loop, while Nishi (West) Gotanda is outside the loop. Nishi-Gotanda is largely residential, with moderately sized apartment buildings close to the JR station and quiet streets in the outer areas. Higashi-Gotanda is home to Seisen University, NTT Medical Center Tokyo, several temples and shrines, and many office buildings. Higashi-Gotanda also has many hotels, including some capsule hotels. The global headquarters of Sony were previously located along Sony Dōri on the eastern edge of Higashi-Gotanda, but most of the complex has moved to adjacent Shinagawa, Minato Ward.

One of Tokyo's busy major avenues, Sakurada Dōri — a part of National Route 1, passes through both halves of Gotanda, carrying traffic between the inner business districts ringing the Imperial Palace grounds and the outlying areas of Shinagawa-ku, Ōta-ku and beyond that the city of Yokohama.

The area is home to the embassies of Belarus, Indonesia, and North Macedonia, and the Consulates General of Brazil and Peru. Educational and medical institutions in the area include Seisen University, Tokyo Health Care University and NTT Medical Center Tokyo. Corporations with their headquarters in Gotanda include Allied Telesis, Comsys, Gakken, and Imagica.

References

External links

Districts of Shinagawa
Apartment hotels